Chal Mera Putt 3 is a 2021 Indian Punjabi-language comedy-drama film directed by Janjot Singh. It is a direct sequel to 2020 film Chal Mera Putt 2. The film is produced by Karaj Gill under Rhythm Boyz Entertainment and by Ashu Munish Sahni under Omjee Star Studios. It stars Amrinder Gill, Simi Chahal in lead roles. The film revolves around Punjabis trying hard to make a living in a foreign land. The film also stars Iftikhar Thakur, Nasir Chinyoti, Akram Udas, Zafri Khan, Gurshabad, Hardeep Gill, Rup Khatkar, Sajan Abbas and Ruby Anam in supporting roles.

Cast 
 Amrinder Gill as Jaswinder Singh 'Jinder'
 Simi Chahal as Swaran Kaur 'Savy'
 Iftikhar Thakur as Chaudhary Shamsher
 Nasir Chinyoti as Tabreez
 Akram Udas as Boota
 Hardeep Gill as Bikkar Chacha
 Rup Khatkar as Bal
 Gurshabad as Balwinder Singh 'Billa'
 Zafri Khan as Advocate Bilal Randhawa 
 Agha Majid as Tabreez's father
 Sajan Abbas as Channa 
 Ruby Anam as Saaira
 Amanat Chan as Mithoo
 Asad Kaifi
 Karamjit Anmol (special appearance)
 Haroon Rafiq as Wedding guest

Music
The music of the film was composed by Dr Zeus and Beat Minister.

Tracklist

Reception 
In India, the film collected ₹1.30-1.35 crore nett on the opening day, making the record for a post pandemic release. In opening weekend, the film collected ₹4.73 crore nett. In North America, the film grossed $210,000 on its opening day, and $644,000 in its opening weekend. In United Kingdom, it grossed £192,957 in its opening weekend, finishing sixth. The film grossed A$283,610 in Australia and NZ$39,694 in New Zealand, in the first week.

Release and Marketing
The film's teaser was released on 29 August 2021. The trailer of the film was released on 28 September 2021.

The film was released worldwide in cinemas on 1 October 2021.

References

External links 

2021 films
2021 comedy-drama films
Punjabi-language Indian films
Indian sequel films
2020s Punjabi-language films
Indian comedy-drama films
India–Pakistan relations in popular culture
Films directed by Janjot Singh